Antispila treitschkiella is a species of moth of the family Heliozelidae. It is found from Great Britain to Ukraine and from Sweden to France, Italy and Greece. It is also found in Portugal.

The wingspan is about 6 mm. Adults are on wing from the end of April to the beginning of June and from July to August.

The larvae feed on Cornus mas and Cornus sanguinea. They mine the leaves of their host plant. The mine starts as a corridor of about 10 mm closely following the leaf margin and containing much frass. Later, the direction reverses and turns into a full depth blotch. Here, the frass is deposited in scattered grains. Full-grown larvae cover an oval section at the margin of the blotch with a layer of silk. They then cut this loose and drops to the ground within it. Larvae can be found in July and from the end of August to early October. The species overwinters in the larval stage, within the case.

References

Moths described in 1843
Heliozelidae
Moths of Europe
Taxa named by Josef Emanuel Fischer von Röslerstamm